The anime series 'Junjō Romantica' is based on the yaoi series Junjō Romantica by Shungiku Nakamura.

Produced by Studio Deen, the anime episodes follow the manga series of the same name by Shungiku Nakamura. Premiering in Japan on TV Hokkaido on April 10, 2008, the series' first season ran for twelve episodes until its conclusion on June 26, 2008. A second season premiered on the same channel on October 12, 2008, where it also ran for twelve episodes. On August 29, 2013, it was announced that more episodes are in production.
The third season began airing on July 8, 2015.

The series uses four pieces of theme music: two opening themes then two ending themes. For the ending theme,  by Script is used for the first season's episodes, while  by Juned is used for the second. The opening theme in the third season is "Innocent Graffiti" by Fo'xTails and the ending theme is "Kawaranai Sora" (変わらない空 -|lit "Unchanging Sky") by Luck Life.

Episode listing

Season 1

Season 2

Season 3

References

External links
 Official Junjo Romantica anime site 
 Official Studio Dean Junjo Romantica anime site 
 
 

Junjo Romantica